The Great Cities' Universities (GCU) coalition, incorporated in 1998, is the successor organization to the Urban 13, an informal research-sharing association of urban universities in major metropolitan areas of the United States.

Great Cities' Universities' nineteen member institutions are public universities located in urban areas in the United States. The consortium engages in public-private partnerships to explore and address urban issues, such as those related to education, housing, environment, criminal justice, transportation, health care, workforce development, and economic stimulation.

Member institutions
University of Alabama at Birmingham
University of Cincinnati
City College of New York
Cleveland State University
Florida International University
Georgia State University
University of Houston
University of Illinois at Chicago
Indiana University Purdue University, Indianapolis
University of Massachusetts Boston
University of Memphis
University of Missouri-Kansas City
University of Missouri-St. Louis
University of New Orleans
Portland State University
Temple University
Virginia Commonwealth University
Wayne State University
University of Wisconsin–Milwaukee

References
 Great Cities' Universities

External links
 Great Cities' Universities

College and university associations and consortia in the United States
1998 establishments in the United States